Khangchendzonga State University is a new government state university in Gangtok, Sikkim, India. The university was established in 2018 as Sikkim State University under The Sikkim State University Act, 2003. In 2021, it was renamed as Khangchendzonga State University vide Act number 16 of 2021  passed by the Sikkim State Assembly. This university is actually named after Mount Khangchendzonga (also spelled as Kangchenjunga), highest mountain peak of the India. It offers postgraduate degree in Nepali, and Sanskrit. This university is also recognized by the University Grants Commission, India.

References

External links

Universities in Sikkim
Universities and colleges in Sikkim
Educational institutions established in 2018
Gangtok
2018 establishments in Sikkim